Kalju Jurkatamm (born 27 September 1941) is an Estonian sprinter.

He was born in Tallinn. In 1966 he graduated from Tartu State University in mathematics.

He began athletics training in 1956, coached by Jaan Pälling. Since 1960 his coach was Hans Torim. 1964–1971 he won 8 medals at Soviet Union championships. He is multiple-time Estonian champion in different athletics disciplines. 1969 he was a member of Soviet Union national athletics team. 1961–1971 he was a member of Estonian national athletics team. 1961–1971 he was invincible in hurdles in Estonia.

References

Living people
1941 births
Estonian male hurdlers
Estonian male sprinters
Soviet male sprinters
University of Tartu alumni
Athletes from Tallinn